William Petty (1623–1687) was an English economist, scientist and philosopher.

William Petty may also refer to:
William Petty, 2nd Earl of Shelburne (1737–1805), great-grandson of William Petty, and Prime Minister from 1782–83
William Petty-FitzMaurice, Earl of Kerry (1811–1836), grandson of the Prime Minister
William G. Petty (born 1949), judge of the Virginia Court of Appeals